Jeremy Stangroom is a British writer, editor, and website designer. He is an editor and co-founder, with Julian Baggini, of The Philosophers’ Magazine, and has written and edited several philosophy books. He is also co-founder, with Ophelia Benson of the website 'Butterflies and Wheels'.

Education
Stangroom was awarded a B.Sc. in sociology in 1985 from Southampton University, an M.Sc in sociology in 1987 from the London School of Economics (LSE), and a Ph.D. in 1996, also from the LSE, for a thesis entitled "Political mobilisation and the question of subjectivity".

Books by Stangroom
The Story of Philosophy: A History of Western Thought, 2012. (With James Garvey)
Does God Hate Women? co-authored with Ophelia Benson
Identity Crisis: Against Multiculturalism - Continuum Publishing, 2008 
Do You Think What You Think You Think? - Granta, 2006 (co-written with Baggini, J.)  
The Little Book of Big Ideas: Philosophy - A & C Black, 2006 
Why Truth Matters - Continuum, 2006 (co-written with Benson, O.) 
Great Philosophers - Arcturus, 2005 (co-written with Garvey. J.)
What Scientists Think - Routledge, 2005.
The Dictionary of Fashionable Nonsense: A Guide for Edgy People - Souvenir Press, 2004 (co-written with Benson, O.)
Great Thinkers A-Z - Continuum, 2004 (co-written with Baggini, J. (eds.))
What Philosophers Think - Continuum, 2003 (co-written with Baggini, J. (eds.))  
New British Philosophy: The interviews - Routledge, 2002 (co-written with Baggini, J. (eds.))

References

External links
JeremyStangroom.com
Website of The Philosophers' Magazine
Digital Edition of The Philosophers' Magazine

Alumni of the London School of Economics
People educated at Sutton Grammar School
Living people
Year of birth missing (living people)
Philosophy journalists